Jennifer ("Jenny") Eva Caroline Gal (born 2 November 1969 in Uccle, Belgium) is a retired judoka who competed for The Netherlands at the 1992 and 1996 Summer Olympics and Italy at the 2000 Summer Olympics.

At the 1996 Atlanta Olympic Games she won the bronze medal in the women's half-middleweight division (– 61 kg).

After her marriage to Italian judoka Giorgio Vismara she represented Italy at the 2000 Summer Olympics. She is the older sister of judoka Jessica Gal (born 1971, Amsterdam), who competed in four consecutive Summer Olympics (1988, 1992, 1996, and 2000) for the Netherlands.

References

External links
 

1969 births
Living people
Dutch female judoka
Italian female judoka
Judoka at the 1992 Summer Olympics
Judoka at the 1996 Summer Olympics
Judoka at the 2000 Summer Olympics
Olympic judoka of the Netherlands
Olympic judoka of Italy
Olympic bronze medalists for the Netherlands
Olympic medalists in judo
People from Uccle
Sportspeople from Amsterdam

Medalists at the 1996 Summer Olympics
Sportspeople from Brussels